The International Songwriting Competition (ISC), founded in 2002, is an annual songwriting contest for both amateur and professional songwriters. There is no physical event to attend as the competition is held online, and anyone in the world can enter. Each year the competition gives away over $150,000 USD in cash and prizes, including $25,000 USD in cash to the overall Grand Prize Winner. Additionally, ISC offers an opportunity for artists to have their songs heard by celebrity artists and music industry executives.

Overview
Depending on the category, submissions are judged on the following criteria:
Creativity
Originality
Lyrics
Melody
Arrangement
Overall likability

There are 24 categories artists can enter:

AAA (Adult Album Alternative)
AC (Adult Contemporary)
Americana
Blues
Children's Music
Christian,
Comedy/Novelty
Country
EDM (Electronic Dance Music)
Folk/Singer-Songwriter
Hip-Hop/Rap
Instrumental
Jazz,
Latin Music
Lyrics Only
Music Video
Performance
Pop/Top 40
R&B/Soul
Rock
Teen
Unpublished
Unsigned
World Music

Winners
Previous winners of the ISC include:

Tones and I
The Band Perry
Faouzia
Illenium
Gin Wigmore
R.LUM.R
Vance Joy
Kimbra
The Teskey Brothers
Amy Shark
Altered Five Blues Band

Judges
The ISC will often have celebrity judges on the panel. Past and Present judges include:

Mariah Carey
Gloria Estefan
Hozier
Dua Lipa
Florida Georgia Line
Linkin Park
Coldplay
The Chainsmokers
Rhianna
Lorde
Bastille
Kristian Bush (Sugarland)
Femi Kuti

References 

Songwriting competitions
2002 establishments